A private military company (PMC) or  private military and security company (PMSC) is a private company providing armed combat or security services for financial gain. PMCs refer to their personnel as "security contractors" or "private military contractors".

The services and expertise offered by PMCs are typically similar to those of governmental security, military, or police but most often on a smaller scale. PMCs often provide services to train or supplement official armed forces in service of governments, but they can also be employed by private companies to provide bodyguards for key staff or protection of company premises, especially in hostile territories. However, contractors that use armed force in a warzone may be considered unlawful combatants in reference to a concept that is outlined in the Geneva Conventions and explicitly stated by the 2006 American Military Commissions Act.

The services of private contractors are used around the world. P. W. Singer, the author of Corporate Warriors: The Rise of the Privatized Military Industry, stated, "In geographic terms, it operates in over 50 countries. It’s operated in every single continent but Antarctica."  Singer noted that in the 1990s, there were 50 military personnel for every contractor and that the ratio is now 10 to 1. He also pointed out that the contractors have a number of duties, depending on who hires them. In developing countries that have natural resources, such as oil refineries in Iraq, they are hired to guard the area. They are hired also to guard companies that contract services and reconstruction efforts such as General Electric.

Apart from securing companies, they secure officials and government affiliates. Private military companies carry out many missions and jobs. Some examples have included close protection for Afghan President Hamid Karzai and piloting reconnaissance airplanes and helicopters as a part of Plan Colombia. According to a 2003 study, the industry was then earning over $100 billion a year.

According to a 2008 study by the Office of the Director of National Intelligence, private contractors make up 29% of the workforce in the United States Intelligence Community and cost the equivalent of 49% of their personnel budgets.

History

Modern PMCs trace their origins back to a group of ex-SAS veterans in 1965 who, under the leadership of the founder of the SAS, Sir David Stirling and John Woodhouse, founded WatchGuard International (formerly with offices in Sloane Street before moving to South Audley Street in Mayfair) as a private company that could be contracted out for security and military purposes.

The company's first assignment was to go to Yemen to report on the state of the royalist forces when a cease-fire was declared. At the same time Stirling was cultivating his contacts in the Iranian government and exploring the chances of obtaining work in Africa. The company eventually operated in Zambia and in Sierra Leone, providing training teams and advising on security matters. Stirling also organised deals to sell weapons and military personnel to other countries for various privatised foreign policy operations. Contracts were mainly with the Gulf States and involved weapons supply and training. The company was also linked with a failed attempt to overthrow Colonel Muammar Gaddafi from power in Libya in 1971. Woodhouse resigned as Director of Operations after a series of disagreements and Stirling himself ceased to take an active part in 1972.

Stirling also founded KAS International (aka KAS Enterprises) and was involved in a collaboration with the World Wide Fund for Nature to forcibly reduce the illegal poaching and smuggling of elephant tusks in various countries of Southern Africa. Other groups formed by ex-SAS servicemen were established in the 1970s and 80s, including Control Risks Group and Defence Systems, providing military consultation and training.

Dramatic growth in the number and size of PMCs occurred at the end of the Cold War, as Western governments increasingly began to rely on their services to bolster falling conventional military budgets. Some of the larger corporations are: Vinnell and Military Professional Resources Inc. in the United States; G4S and Keeni-Meeny Services in the United Kingdom; Lordan-Levdan in Israel and Executive Outcomes in South Africa.

The exodus of over 6 million military personnel from Western militaries in the 1990s expanded the recruiting pool for PMCs.

Some commentators have argued that there was an exodus from many special operations forces across the globe towards these private military corporations. Units that were allegedly severely affected included the British Special Air Service, the US Special Operations Forces and the Canadian Joint Task Force 2.

The Center for Public Integrity reported that since 1994, the Defense Department entered into 3,601 contracts worth $300 billion with 12 U.S. based PMCs, specifically during the initial response after Hurricane Katrina in New Orleans.

Domestic operations are generally under the auspice of state or federal agencies such as the Department of Energy or the Department of Homeland Security rather than the Department of Defense. Driven by increasingly greater fears of domestic terror attacks and civil unrest and disruption in the wake of disasters, more conventional security companies are moving into operations arenas that would fall within the definition of a PMC. The United States State Department also employs several companies to provide support in danger zones that would be difficult for conventional U.S. forces.

The October 2000 USS Cole bombing proved a pivotal moment for private military companies at sea, and directly led to the first contract between Blackwater and the US military.

PMCs in Iraq

In December 2006, there were estimated to be at least 100,000 contractors working directly for the United States Department of Defense in Iraq which was a tenfold increase in the use of private contractors for military operations since the Persian Gulf War, just over a decade earlier. The prevalence of PMCs led to the foundation of trade group the Private Security Company Association of Iraq. In Iraq, the issue of accountability, especially in the case of contractors carrying weapons, was a sensitive one. Iraqi laws do not hold over contractors.

U.S. Secretary of Defense Donald Rumsfeld justified the use of PMCs in Iraq on the basis that they were cost effective and useful on the ground. He also affirmed that they were not subject to the Uniform Code of Military Justice.

Two days before he left Iraq, L. Paul Bremer signed "Order 17" giving all Americans associated with the CPA and the American government immunity from Iraqi law. A July 2007 report from the American Congressional Research Service indicates that the Iraqi government still had no authority over private security firms contracted by the U.S. government.

In 2007, the Uniform Code of Military Justice was amended to allow for prosecution of military contractors who are deployed in a "declared war or a contingency operation."

PMCs supplied support to U.S. military bases throughout the Persian Gulf, from operating mess halls to providing security. They supplied armed guards at a U.S. Army base in Qatar, and they used live ammunition to train soldiers at Camp Doha in Kuwait. They maintained an array of weapons systems vital to the invasion of Iraq. They also provided bodyguards for VIPs, guard installations, and escort supply convoys from Kuwait. All these resources were called upon constantly.

List of occurrences
 Employees of private military company CACI and Titan Corp. were involved in the Iraq Abu Ghraib prison scandal in 2003, and 2004. The U.S. Army "found that contractors were involved in 36 percent of the [Abu Ghraib] proven incidents and identified 6 employees as individually culpable", although none have faced prosecution unlike US military personnel.
 On March 31, 2004, four American private contractors belonging to the company Blackwater USA were killed by insurgents in Fallujah as they drove through the town. They were dragged from their car in one of the most violent attacks on U.S. contractors in the conflict. Following the attack, an angry mob mutilated and burned the bodies, dragging them through the streets before they were hung on a bridge. (See also: 31 March 2004 Fallujah ambush, Operation Vigilant Resolve)
 On March 28, 2005, 16 American contractors and three Iraqi aides from Zapata Engineering, under contract to the US Army Corps of Engineers to manage an ammunition storage depot, were detained following two incidents in which they allegedly fired upon U.S. Marine checkpoint. While later released, the contractors have levied complaints of mistreatment against the Marines who detained them.
 On June 5, 2005, Colonel Theodore S. Westhusing committed suicide, after writing a report exonerating US Investigations Services of allegations of fraud, waste and abuse he received in an anonymous letter in May.
 On October 27, 2005, a "trophy" video, complete with post-production Elvis Presley music, appearing to show private military contractors in Baghdad shooting Iraqi civilians sparked two investigations after it was posted on the Internet. The video has been linked unofficially to Aegis Defence Services. According to the posters, the man who is seen shooting vehicles on this video in Iraq was a South African employee of Aegis Victory team named Danny Heydenreycher. He served in the British military for six years. After the incident the regional director for Victory ROC tried to fire Heydenreycher, but the team threatened to resign if he did. Aegis, the U.S. Army, and the U.S. State Department each conducted a formal inquiry into the issue. The Army determined that there was no "probable cause to believe that a crime was committed."
 On September 17, 2007, the Iraqi government announced that it was revoking the license of the American security firm Blackwater USA over the firm's involvement in the deaths of seventeen Iraqis in a firefight that followed a car bomb explosion near a State Department motorcade. The company was allowed to continue to operate in Iraq until January 2009 when the U.S.–Iraq Status of Forces Agreement took effect.  Blackwater was one of the most high-profile firms operating in Iraq, with around 1,000 employees as well as a fleet of helicopters in the country. In 2014, four Blackwater employees were tried and convicted in U.S. federal court over the incident; one of murder, and the other three of manslaughter and firearms charges. 
 On March 12, 2017, Sallyport Global fired two investigators who alleged sex trafficking, alcohol smuggling, and security lapses by Sallyport employees at Balad Air Base in Iraq.

Involvement in anti-piracy efforts 

Since the late 2000s, PMCs have become increasingly involved in anti-piracy measures in Somalia and other regions. PMCs remain active in this region, mainly providing security for private shipping through the Gulf of Aden and at times contracting to aid UN efforts. PMCs were hired to deter pirates from attacking vessels and taking the shipping crew and their transport hostage. While, a large variety of international naval missions with the same goals such as the EU's Atalanta, NATO's Ocean Shield, and Combined Task Force 150 are and were active in this region, it is still necessary for the shipping companies to have security personnel on-deck. While these PMCs seem to be successful in providing this de-centralized form of security, it also has a large downside since, inherent to its de-centralized nature, it is very hard for the UN or other international organizations to provide effective oversight over what happens at the seas. Whereas, the UN showed that between 2010 and 2015 there were over 50 encounters between the national sovereign Navies, that participated in the missions, resulting in over 1200 detained pirates, only one PMC published information over this period. Since the PMCs are so much more active in this area, and covering a larger part of it through it activities on board of trading ships, this could be a low estimate. PMC presence in Somalia is an example of two violent non-state actors at sea engaged in combat with each other.

Fatalities
By the end of 2012, the number of contractors who had died in Iraq, Afghanistan and Kuwait had reached 3,000. Scholars have studied whether contractor deaths have an effect on the public's "casualty sensitivity" when substituted for military fatalities. Casualty sensitivity refers to the inverse relationship between military deaths and public support for a sustained military engagement. Contractor deaths may account for nearly 30% of total US battlefield losses since the beginning of the wars in Iraq and Afghanistan.

International legal issues

In October 2007, the United Nations released a two-year study that reported that, although hired as "security guards", private contractors performed military duties. Many countries, including the United States and the United Kingdom, are not signatories to the 1989 United Nations Mercenary Convention banning the use of mercenaries. A spokesman for the American mission to the U.N. office in Geneva (UNOG) said that "Accusations that U.S. government-contracted security guards, of whatever nationality, are mercenaries is inaccurate." An observer noted that the difficulty in separating private from public troops means that legal proceedings against these violent non-state actors can be complicated, and stated that contracted combatants carry the legitimacy of the state that hires them.

Activities elsewhere

 In 1994 and 1995, the South African-based PMC Executive Outcomes was involved in two military actions in Africa. In the first conflict, Executive Outcomes fought on behalf of the Angolan government against UNITA after a UN-brokered peace settlement broke down. In the second action, Executive Outcomes was tasked with containing a guerrilla movement in Sierra Leone, the Revolutionary United Front. Both missions involved personnel from the firm training four to five thousand combat personnel for the Angolan government and retaking control of the diamond fields and forming a negotiated peace in Sierra Leone.
 In 1995, both Croatia and Bosnia hired Military Professional Resources Inc. (MPRI) to equip, train, and professionalize their armed forces.
 In 1999, an incident involving DynCorp in Bosnia was followed by a Racketeer Influenced and Corrupt Organizations Act (RICO) lawsuit being filed against DynCorp employees stationed in Bosnia. It alleged that "employees and supervisors from DynCorp were engaging in perverse, illegal and inhumane behavior and were illegally purchasing women, weapons, forged passports and participating in other immoral acts."
 In 2000, ABC Television's international affairs program "Foreign Correspondent" broadcast a special report, "Sierra Leone: Soldiers of Fortune", focusing on the exploits of South African pilot Neall Ellis and his MI-24 Hind gunship. The report also investigated the failures of the UN Peacekeeping Force and the involvement of mercenaries/private military contractors in providing vital support to UN operations and British military Special Operations in Sierra Leone in 1999–2000.
 On April 5, 2005, Jamie Smith, CEO of SCG International Risk announced the expansion of services from the traditional roles of PMCs of protection and intelligence to military aviation support. SCG International Air would provide air support, medevac (medical evacuation), rotary and fixed-wing transportation, heavy-lift cargo, armed escort, and executive air travel to "any location on earth." That marked a unique addition and expansion of services to rival the capabilities of some countries's armies and air forces.
 On March 27, 2006, J. Cofer Black, the vice chairman of Blackwater USA, announced to attendees of a special operations exhibition in Jordan that his company could now provide a brigade-size force for low intensity conflicts. According to Black, "There is clear potential to conduct security operations at a fraction of the cost of NATO operations." Those comments were later denied.
 In mid-May 2006, police in the Democratic Republic of the Congo arrested 32 alleged mercenaries of different nationalities; 19 from South Africa, 10 from Nigeria and three from the United States. Half of them worked for the South African company Omega Security Solutions, and the Americans worked for AQMI Strategy Corp. The men were accused of plotting to overthrow the government, but charges were not pressed. The men were deported to their home countries.
 In 2006, a US congressional report listed a number of PMCs and other enterprises that have signed contracts to carry out anti-narcotics operations and related activities as part of Plan Colombia. DynCorp was among those contracted by the State Department, and others signed contracts with the Defense Department. Other companies from different countries, including Israel, have also signed contracts with the Colombian Defense Ministry to carry out security or military activities.
 In December 2009, the Congressional Research Service, which provides background information to members of the United States Congress, announced that the deployment of 30,000 extra US troops into Afghanistan could be accompanied by a surge of "26,000 to 56,000" contractors. This would expand the presence of personnel from the US private sector in Afghanistan "to anywhere from 130,000 to 160,000." The CRS study said that contractors made up 69 percent of the Pentagon's personnel in Afghanistan in December 2008, a proportion that "apparently represented the highest recorded percentage of contractors used by the Defense Department in any conflict in the history of the United States." In September 2008 their presence had dropped to 62 percent, and the US military troop strength increased modestly.
 Also in December 2009, a US House of Representatives oversight subcommittee stated that it had begun a wide-ranging investigation into allegations that American private security companies that were hired to protect Defense Department convoys in Afghanistan would be paying off warlords and the Taliban to ensure safe passage. That would mean that the United States unintentionally and indirectly engaged in a protection racket and might be indirectly funding the very insurgents it is trying to fight. A preliminary inquiry determined that the allegations warranted a deeper inquiry and focused initially on eight trucking companies that share a $2.2 billion Defense Department contract to carry goods and material from main supply points inside Afghanistan (primarily Bagram air base) to more than 100 forward operating bases and other military facilities in the country.
 In 2015, STTEP International, (Specialised Tasks, Training, Equipment & Protection) was credited with providing support to the Nigerian military that has proved decisive in containing Boko Haram activities in Nigeria. The chairman of STTEP, Eeben Barlow, is the former CEO and founder of Executive Outcomes.
 Since 2015, the United Arab Emirates hired an estimated 1,800 Latin American contractors and 400 Eritrean troops for training and combat to support the Yemeni government's efforts against the Houthi rebels during the Yemeni Civil War. 
 Contractors from the Frontier Services Group (FSG) have established close ties with Chinese state-owned firms since 2014 by providing security, logistics, and aviation for Chinese companies in dozens of countries across Asia, Africa, and Europe in connection with China's Belt and Road Initiative. In February 2019, FSG signed a preliminary deal with the Chinese government to establish a training base in Kashgar, Xinjiang.
 Russian Wagner Group mercenaries have been deployed in the 2022 Russian invasion of Ukraine, fighting alongside the Russian Armed Forces.

In wildlife preservation
The Central African-based park-ranger organization African Wildlife Defence Force contracts former servicemen and law enforcement personnel to protect national parks and private game ranches in Africa. Candidates must undergo additional retraining to become park rangers. They are also referred to as Private Ranger Contractors or PRC.

Relation to non-governmental organizations
The use of private security contractors by NGOs in dangerous regions is a highly sensitive subject. Many NGOs have sought the services of private security contractors in dangerous areas of operation, such as Afghanistan, Somalia and Sudan due to the following reasons:
 Lack of knowledge/skills and time to adequately meet the challenges of deteriorating security environments; and
 Administrative costs of managing security in-house and potential to outsource the liability.
Quite often the contractors hired are local companies and mostly are unarmed personnel guarding facilities, only very rarely are international contractors or mobile armed security personnel used.

However, there are a great many voices against their use who cite the following problems:
 Outsourcing security left NGOs reliant on contractors and unable to develop their own security thinking and make their own decisions
 Perceived association of PSPs with state security, police or military services in turn compromises the ability of NGOs to claim neutrality, leading to increased risk;
 Outsourcing may not necessarily lead to lower costs, and the cost of middlemen may result in more poorly paid and poorly trained personnel who turn over frequently and cannot adequately perform the job; and
 NGOs have obligations beyond strictly legal liability that include political, ethical and reputational implications – if the organisation's responsibility to prevent and mitigate any possible negative outcomes is better achieved through in-house security, this should be their choice.

The result is that many NGOs are not open about their use of PSPs and researchers' at the Overseas Development Institute studies have found that sometimes statements at NGOs central headquarters contradict those given by local staff. This prevents informative knowledge-sharing and debate on the subject needed to improve NGOs decisions regarding this issue, though there have been some notable exceptions (Afghanistan NGO Security Office (ANSO) and the NGO Coordination Committee in Iraq (NCCI)). The Private Security Contractor fulfills many different needs in the private and public sectors. While some nations rely heavily on the input of governments such as the US, other countries do not trust the US, so they tend to look for private contractors who will have a fiduciary obligation them. According to Joel Vargas, Director of Operations for Contingent Security Services, Ltd and assistant director for InterPort Police, it will be impossible to build democracies without having the assistance from the private sector performing activities for clients.

Future
After the withdrawal of U.S. troops from Iraq, the U.S. State Department is reportedly planning to more than double the number of its private security guards, up to as many as 7,000. Defending five fortified compounds across the country, the security contractors would operate radars to warn of enemy rocket attacks, search for roadside bombs, fly reconnaissance drones and even staff quick reaction forces to aid civilians in distress. Its helicopter fleet, which will be piloted by contractors, will grow from 17 to 29.

Due to strain of United States Armed Forces, the U.S. State Department and The Pentagon has also outsourced the expanded military training in Africa to three companies: Military Professional Resources Inc., DFI International, and Logicon (now owned by Northrop Grumman).

Regulation
Demands for specific PSC services have grown to record levels in recent decades, and private firm's capabilities now include an array of services that are vital to the success of on-the-ground war fighting as well as other more traditional stability operations and contingency contracting. While past calls for corporate responsibility have heralded successes such as the Kimberley Process and the Extractive Industries Transparency Initiative in widespread international operations, there has also been a move within the PSC and contingency contracting industries to call for accountability and to implement a code of ethics for the retention of services and operations of such service providers. Existing credible accountability initiatives form a skeleton for governing the conduct of contractors, but much remains to be fleshed out to form a coherent and standardized framework from which to oversee such organizations and activities. Over the last decade there have been a number of initiatives to regulate the private security industry. These include the ISO/PAS 28007:2012 Guidelines for Private Maritime Security Companies and the ANSI/ASIS PSC.1 and PSC.4 standards.

ASIS Commission on Standards 
Founded in 1955, ASIS is a society of individual security professionals dedicated to increasing the effectiveness and productivity of security professionals by developing educational programs and materials. ASIS is an ANSI-accredited Standards Developing Organization, and within ASIS the ASIS Commission on Standards and Guidelines works with national and international standards-setting organizations and industry representatives to develop voluntary standards and guidelines for security professionals. With funding from the U.S. Department of Defense, the ASIS Commission on Standards is currently promulgating four sets of standards for private security companies.

The International Code of Conduct for Private Security Providers 

In 2008, the International Committee of the Red Cross, the Swiss government, and contributors from private security companies and the civil society/NGO sector developed and proposed the Montreux Document on Private Military and Security Companies.  The document details international legal obligations and lists specific recommendations related to PSC services procurement practices and operational oversight, and clarifies the obligations of States pertaining to the hiring of such entities during armed conflicts.

Cultural references

Films and television 
In Marvel Television's The Punisher on Netflix, a PMC by the name of "ANVIL" is heavily featured. ANVIL's founder, Billy Russo, being one of the primary antagonists of the series. Much like real PMCs, ANVIL provides training spaces for U.S. forces on American and foreign soil.

Video games 
Private military companies are explored extensively in the Metal Gear franchise, with several games (particularly Metal Gear Solid: Peace Walker, Metal Gear Solid 4: Guns of the Patriots, and Metal Gear Solid V: The Phantom Pain) featuring the command of fictional PMCs. In the game's universe, which takes place in the 20th and 21st centuries, traditional militaries eventually collapse as the world becomes run by PMCs.

The Ace Combat series frequently features mercenary pilots that are implied or stated to be part of PMCs. The protagonists of Air Combat, Ace Combat 2, Ace Combat Zero: The Belkan War, Ace Combat: Joint Assault, and Ace Combat Infinity are depicted as mercenaries; Joint Assault and Infinity in particular specifically feature PMCs as the protagonists. Additionally, the similar game Project Wingman features the "Sicario Mercenary Corps" as the protagonist faction.

"Shadow Company", a secret PMC led by General Shepherd, appears as a major enemy faction in Call of Duty: Modern Warfare 2 and made it into the original game's reboot as well as its sequel. In addition, the private military organization "Atlas Corporation" features in Call of Duty: Advanced Warfare, the "Federation" soldier named is "Elite PMC" in Call of Duty: Ghosts and Call of Duty: Mobile.

In Contract Wars and its sequels, Hired Ops and Escape from Tarkov, the conflict depicted in the series erupts between two fictional PMCs, the Russian "BEAR" and the Western "USEC".

In the Grand Theft Auto series, "Merryweather Security", parody of Blackwater, appears as an antagonistic force. They are a major antagonist in Grand Theft Auto V, and appear as both an antagonistic force and an optional indirect supporting faction in Grand Theft Auto Online.

In Girls' Frontline, the PMC "Griffin and Kryuger" is the main protagonist faction.

In Watch Dogs: Legion, a PMC named "Albion" is one of the primary antagonistic factions.

See also
 List of private military contractors
 List of private security companies
 Private police
 Company police
 Private army
 Command responsibility
 Condottieri
 Defense contractor
 Law of war
 LOGCAP
 Military–industrial complex
 Personal Security Detachment
 Private defense agency
 Private intelligence agency
 Privateer

References

Sources

Academic publications
 Arnold, Guy. Mercenaries: The Scourge of the Third World. Palgrave Macmillan, 1999. 
 Deborah D. Avant. The Market for Force: The Consequences of Privatizing Security. George Washington University, August 2005. 
Deborah D. Avant and  Kara Kingma Neu. 2019. "The Private Security Events Database." Journal of Conflict Resolution.
Brillstein, Arik: Antiterrorsystem. Engel Publishing 2005
 Brooks, Doug/ Rathgeber, Shawn Lee: The Industry Role in Regulating Private Security Companies, in: Canadian Consortium on Human Security - Security Privatization: Challenges and Opportunities, Vol. 6.3, University of British Columbia, March 2008.
 Simon Chesterman & Chia Lehnardt, eds. From Mercenaries to Market: The Rise and Regulation of Private Military Companies. Oxford: Oxford UP, 2009.
 Niccolò Machiavelli. The Prince. 1532. See ch. 12.
 Amy E. Eckert, Outsourcing War: The Just War Tradition in the Age of Military Privatization, Cornell University Press, 2016.
 Robert Mandel. Armies Without States: The Privatization of Security. Lynne Rienner Publishers, 2002.
 
 Fred Schreier & Marina Caparini. "Privatising Security: Law, Practice and Governance of Private Military and Security Companies", DCAF Occasional Paper 6, The Geneva Centre for the Democratic Control of Armed Forces, March 2005.
 Filipa Guinote. "Private Military Firms and the State: Sharing Responsibility for Violations of Human Rights and Humanitarian Law", Collection Ricerche, "Series E.MA Awarded thesis", vol. 7, Venice: Marsilio Editori, 2006.
 David Shearer. Private Armies and Military Intervention, April 1998. 
 P. W. Singer. Corporate Warriors: The Rise of the Privatized Military Industry. Cornell University Press, March 2004. 
 Stephan Maninger. "Soldiers of Misfortune – Is the Demise of National Armies a Core Contributing Factor in the Rise of Private Security Companies?", Private Security and Military Companies: Chances, Problems, Pitfalls and Prospects, eds. Gerhard Kümmel & Thomas Jäger. Wiesbaden: VS Verlag für Sozialwissenschaften, 2007. 
 Hin-Yan Liu. "Leashing the Corporate Dogs of War: The Legal Implications of the Modern Private Military Company", Journal of Conflict and Security Law 15(1) 2010: 141–168. 
 Woolley, Peter J. "Soldiers of Fortune," The Common Review, v. 5, no. 4 (2007), pp. 46–48.
 Petrovic Predrag, Milosevic Marko, Unijat Jelena & Stojanovic Sonja. Private Security Companies – a Friend or a foe? . Centre for Civil-Military Relations, 2008.

Non-academic publications
 Making A Killing, James Ashcroft. Virgin Books. 
 Licensed to Kill : Privatizing the War on Terror, Robert Young Pelton 
 Three Worlds Gone Mad: Dangerous Journeys through the War Zones of Africa, Asia, and the South Pacific, Robert Young Pelton, August 2006. 
 An Unorthodox Soldier, Tim Spicer, September 2000. 
 Blackwater: The Rise of the World's Most Powerful Mercenary Army, Jeremy Scahill, Nation Books. February 2007. 
 Contractor, Giampiero Spinelli Mursia Editore 2009 
 Guns For Hire: The Inside Story of Freelance Soldiering, Tony Geraghty, Portrait. 2007. 
 Private Security Contractors in Iraq and Afghanistan: Legal Issues, Jennifer K. Elsea, Congressional Research Service, January 7, 2010
 Irak, terre mercenaire : les armées privées remplacent les troupes américaines [Iraq, mercenary land: private armies replace US troops], by Georges-Henri Bricet des Vallons, Favre (Lausanne:Switzerland), January 2010. . Only in French.
 Dirty Deeds Done Cheap: The Incredible Story of My Life from the SBS to a Hired Gun in Iraq, by Mike Mercer, John Blake. 2009.

External links

Military–industrial complex
 

Types of military forces
Types of business entity
Military Company